Qaleh Cheh (also Romanized as Qal‘eh Cheh) is a village in Sivkanlu Rural District, in the Central District of Shirvan County, North Khorasan Province, Iran. At the 2006 census, its population was 576, in 140 families.

References 

Populated places in Shirvan County